is a Japanese professional baseball infielder for the Yokohama DeNA BayStars in Japan's Nippon Professional Baseball. He previously played for the Chunichi Dragons.

Kyōda was the 2017 Central League Rookie of the Year and was previously the player's representative for the Dragons.

Career

On 20 October 2016, Kyōda was selected as the 2nd draft pick for the Chunichi Dragons at the 2016 NPB Draft and on 26 November signed a provisional contract with a ¥85,000,000 sign-on bonus and a ¥12,000,000 yearly salary.

On February 27, 2019, he was selected for Japan national baseball team at the 2019 exhibition games against Mexico.

References

External links

, NPB

1994 births
Living people
Baseball people from Ishikawa Prefecture
Chunichi Dragons players
Yokohama DeNA BayStars players
Japanese baseball players
Nippon Professional Baseball Rookie of the Year Award winners
Nippon Professional Baseball shortstops